Animal euthanasia (euthanasia from ; "good death") is the act of killing an animal humanely, most commonly with injectable drugs. Reasons for euthanasia include incurable (and especially painful) conditions or diseases, lack of resources to continue supporting the animal, or laboratory test procedures. Euthanasia methods are designed to cause minimal pain and distress. Euthanasia is distinct from animal slaughter and pest control.

In domesticated animals, this process is commonly referred to by euphemisms such as "put down" or "put to sleep".

Methods 
The methods of euthanasia can be divided into pharmacological and physical methods. Acceptable pharmacological methods include injected drugs and gases that first depress the central nervous system and then cardiovascular activity. Acceptable physical methods must first cause rapid loss of consciousness by disrupting the central nervous system. The most common methods are discussed here, but there are other acceptable methods used in different situations.

Intravenous anesthetic 
Upon administration of intravenous anesthetic, unconsciousness, respiratory then cardiac arrest follow rapidly, usually within 30 seconds.

Some veterinarians perform a two-stage process: an initial injection that simply renders the pet unconscious and a second shot that causes death. This allows the owner the chance to say goodbye to a live pet without their emotions stressing the animal. It also greatly mitigates any tendency toward spasm and other involuntary movement which tends to increase the emotional upset that the pet's owner experiences.

For large animals, the volumes of barbiturates required are considered by some to be impractical, although this is standard practice in the United States. For horses and cattle, other drugs may be available. Some specially formulated combination products are available, such as Somulose (secobarbital/cinchocaine) and Tributame (embutramide/chloroquine/lidocaine), which cause deep unconsciousness and cardiac arrest independently with a lower volume of injection, thus making the process faster, safer, and more effective.

Occasionally, a horse injected with these mixtures may display apparent seizure activity before death. This may be due to premature cardiac arrest. However, if normal precautions (e.g., sedation with detomidine) are taken, this is rarely a problem. Anecdotal reports that long-term use of phenylbutazone increases the risk of this reaction are unverified.

After the animal has died, it is not uncommon for the body to have posthumous body jerks or a sudden bladder outburst.

Inhalants 

Gas anesthetics such as isoflurane and sevoflurane can be used for euthanasia of very small animals. The animals are placed in sealed chambers where high levels of anesthetic gas are introduced. Death may also be caused using carbon dioxide once unconsciousness has been achieved by inhaled anaesthetic. Carbon dioxide is often used on its own for euthanasia of wild animals. There are mixed opinions on whether it causes distress when used on its own, with human experiments lending support to the evidence that it can cause distress and equivocal results in non-humans. In 2013, the American Veterinary Medical Association (AVMA) issued new guidelines for carbon dioxide induction, stating that a flow rate of 10% to 30% volume/min is optimal for the humane euthanization of small rodents.

Carbon monoxide is often used, but some states in the US have banned its use in animal shelters: although carbon monoxide poisoning is not particularly painful, the conditions in the gas chamber are often not humane. Nitrogen has been shown to be effective, although some young animals are more resistant to the effects, and it currently is not widely used.

Cervical dislocation 
Cervical dislocation, or displacement (breaking or fracturing) of the neck, is an older and less common method of killing small animals such as mice. Performed properly it is intended to cause as painless a death as possible and has no cost or equipment involved. The handler must know the proper method of executing the movement which will cause the cervical displacement and without proper training and method education there is a risk of not causing death and can cause severe pain and suffering. It is unknown how long an animal remains conscious, or the level of suffering it goes through after a correct snapping of the neck, which is why it has become less common and often substituted with inhalants.

Intracardiac or intraperitoneal injection 
When intravenous injection is not possible, euthanasia drugs such as pentobarbital can be injected directly into a heart chamber or body cavity.

While intraperitoneal injection is fully acceptable (although it may take up to 15 minutes to take effect in dogs and cats), an intracardiac (IC) injection may only be performed on an unconscious or deeply sedated animal. Performing IC injections on a fully conscious animal in places with humane laws for animal handling is often a criminal offense.

Shooting 

This can be a means of euthanasia for large animals—such as horses, cattle, and deer—if performed properly.
This may be performed by means of:

 Firearms  Traditionally used in the field for euthanizing horses, deer or other large game animals. The animal is shot in the forehead with the bullet directed down the spine through the medulla oblongata, resulting in instant death. The risks are minimal if carried out by skilled personnel in a suitable location.

 Captive bolt gun  Commonly used by the meat packing industry to slaughter cattle and other livestock. The bolt is fired through the forehead causing massive disruption of the cerebral cortex. In cattle, this stuns the animal, though if left for a prolonged period it will die from cerebral oedema. Death should therefore be rapidly brought about by pithing or exsanguination. Horses are killed outright by the captive bolt, making pithing and exsanguination unnecessary.

Reasons 
The reasons for euthanasia of pets and other animals include:

 Terminal illness, e.g. cancer or rabies
 Illness or accident that is not terminal but would cause suffering for the animal to live with, or when the owner cannot afford, or when the owner has a moral objection to the treatment
 A hunter's coup de grâce
 Behavioral problems (usually ones that cannot be corrected) e.g. aggression – Canines that have usually caused grievous bodily harm (severe injuries or death) to either humans or other animals through mauling are usually seized and euthanized ('destroyed' in British legal terms)
 Old age and deterioration leading to loss of major bodily functions, resulting in severe impairment of the quality of life
 Lack of home or caretaker or resources for feeding
 Research and testing – In the course of scientific research or testing, animals may be euthanized in order to be dissected, to prevent suffering after testing, to prevent the spread of disease, or other reasons

Small animal euthanasia is typically performed in a veterinary clinic or hospital or in an animal shelter and is usually carried out by a veterinarian or a veterinary technician working under the veterinarian's supervision. Often animal shelter workers are trained to perform euthanasia as well. Some veterinarians will perform euthanasia at the pet owner's home—this is virtually mandatory in the case of large animal euthanasia. In the case of large animals which have sustained injuries, this will also occur at the site of the accident, for example, on a racecourse.

Some animal rights organizations support animal euthanasia in certain circumstances and practice euthanasia at shelters that they operate.

Legal status 
In the U.S., for companion animals euthanized in animal shelters, most states prescribe intravenous injection as the required method. These laws date to 1990, when Georgia's Humane Euthanasia Act became the first state law to mandate this method. Before that, gas chambers and other means were commonly employed. The Georgia law was resisted by the Georgia Commissioner of Agriculture, Tommy Irvin, who was charged with enforcing the act. In March 2007, he was sued by former State Representative Chesley V. Morton, who wrote the law, and subsequently ordered by the court to enforce all provisions of the Act.

Some states allow the use of carbon monoxide chambers for euthanasia.

Remains 
Many pet owners choose to have their pets cremated or buried after the pet is euthanized, and there are pet funeral homes that specialize in animal burial or cremation. Otherwise, the animal facility will often freeze the body and subsequently send it to the local landfill.

In some instances, animals euthanized at shelters or animal control agencies have been sent to meat rendering facilities to be processed for use in cosmetics, fertilizer, gelatin, poultry feed, pharmaceuticals and pet food. It was proposed that the presence of pentobarbital in dog food may have caused dogs to become less responsive to the drug when being euthanized. However, a 2002 FDA study found no dog or cat DNA in the foods they tested, so it was theorized that the drug found in dog food came from euthanized cattle and horses. Furthermore, the level of the drug found in pet food was safe.

See also 

 Animal chaplains
 Animal loss
 Animal slaughter
 Animal welfare
 British Pet Massacre
 Chick culling
 Dysthanasia (animal)
 Insect euthanasia
 Overpopulation in companion animals
 Pet
 Rainbow Bridge (pets)

References

External links 

AVMA Guidelines on Euthanasia
Euthanasia of Animals Used for Scientific Purposes at The University of Adelaide
World Internet News chronicles what happens to abandoned dogs.
Reasons to euthanize your pet at home
National Agricultural Library, United States Department of Agriculture
No Kill Advocacy Center – "no kill" shelter advocacy organization
Recommendations for euthanasia of experimental animals: Part1
Recommendations for euthanasia of experimental animals: Part2
Chesley V. Morton v. Georgia Department of Agriculture and Tommy Irvin in his Official Capacity as Commissioner

Animal euthanasia